The Super Bowl of Poker (also known as Amarillo Slim's Super Bowl of Poker or SBOP) was the second most prestigious poker tournament in the world during the 1980s.  While the World Series of Poker was already drawing larger crowds as more and more amateurs sought it out, the SBOP "was an affair limited almost exclusively to pros and hard-core amateurs."

The 1991 Tournament was the last SBOP.  After Caesar's Casino in Las Vegas closed its poker room, Amarillo Slim had to find a new location for the event and the best deal that he could find forced participants to drive two hours.  This resulted in the smallest SBOP fields ever; the Main Event only had 12 participants.  Because of the small size of the field, fewer people were paid than in previous tournaments and the prestige of winning the events suffered a setback that doomed the SBOP and made 1991 the last year for the tournament.

The winners of the tournament, however, continued to represent some of the biggest names in poker.  Barbara Enright, the only woman in the Poker Hall of Fame, won the ladies event.  Jack Keller, another Hall of Famer, won two events, the  $1,000 Pot Limit Omaha and the $10,000 Main Event.  Having won the event in 1984, this was his second time to have won the $10,000 Main Event.

Prior to SBOP, the only high dollar tournament a person could enter was the WSOP.  "The World Series of Poker was so successful that everybody wanted more than one tournament," Amarillo Slim said.  Slim called upon his connections and friendships with poker's elite to start a new tournament in the February 1979.  Before the SBOP had developed a reputation of its own, many of the most respected names in poker attended the tournament "more to support Slim and take advantage of the very fat cash games the event would obviously inspire."  Slim modelled his SBOP after the WSOP with several events and a $10,000 Texas Hold'em Main Event.

One of the principal differences between the WSOP and the SBOP was the prize structure.  The WSOP's prize structure was flat, ensuring more people received smaller pieces of the prize pool.  The SBOP typically used a 60-30-10 payout structure.  In other words, only the first three places received money and generally in the ratio of 60% to first place, 30% to second place, and 10% to third.  This payment schedule dominated in the SBOP for the first 5 years of the event, but as the event grew the number of payouts increased while keeping the payout schedule top heavy.

Key

Event 1: $500 Limit Hold'em 

 Number of buy-ins: 145
 Total prize pool: $72,500
 Number of payouts: 18
 Reference:

Event 2: $500 Limit Omaha 

 Number of buy-ins: 79
 Total prize pool: $39,500
 Number of payouts: 9
 Reference:

Event 3: $500 Limit Seven Card Stud 

 Number of buy-ins: 99
 Total prize pool: $49,500
 Number of payouts: 8
 Reference:

Event 4: $1,000 Limit Ace To Five Lowball 

 Number of buy-ins: 29
 Total prize pool: $29,000
 Number of payouts: 8
 Reference:

Event 5: $1,000 Limit Omaha Hi/Lo 

 Number of buy-ins: 55
 Total prize pool: $55,000
 Number of payouts: 9
 Reference:

Event 5: $1,000 Seven Card Stud Hi/Lo 

 Number of buy-ins: 36
 Total prize pool: $36,000
 Number of payouts: 8
 Reference:

Event 6: $ 1,000 Pot Limit Omaha 

 Number of buy-ins: 38
 Total prize pool: $38,000
 Number of payouts: 9
 Reference:

Event 7: $1,000 Limit Seven Card Razz

 Number of buy-ins: 28
 Total prize pool: $28,000
 Number of payouts: 4
 Reference:

Event 8: $1,000 Limit Hold'em

 Number of buy-ins: 57
 Total prize pool: $57,000
 Number of payouts: 9
 Reference:

Event 9: $1,000 Limit Omaha

 Number of buy-ins: 30
 Total prize pool: $30,000
 Number of payouts: 5
 Reference:

Event 10: $1,000 Limit Seven Card Stud

 Number of buy-ins: 31
 Total prize pool: $31,000
 Number of payouts: 5
 Reference:

Event 11: $1,500 Limit Hold'em

 Number of buy-ins: 43
 Total prize pool: $64,500
 Number of payouts: 9
 Reference:

Event 12: $2,500 No-Limit Deuce To Seven Lowball with Rebuys

 Number of buy-ins: Not Recorded
 Total prize pool: Not Recorded
 Number of payouts: Not Recorded
 Reference:

Event 13: $1,500 Limit Hold'em

 Number of buy-ins: 34
 Total prize pool: $51,000
 Number of payouts: 5
 Reference:

Event 14: $400 Seven Card Stud (Ladies)

 Number of buy-ins: 13
 Total prize pool: $5,200
 Number of payouts: 5
 Reference:

Event 15: $10,000 No-Limit Hold'em

 Number of buy-ins: 12
 Total prize pool: $95,000
 Number of payouts: 3
 Reference:

References

Super Bowl of Poker
1991 in poker